The  is a professional wrestling tag team championship owned by the Ice Ribbon promotion. The championship was introduced on April 4, 2007, at an Ice Ribbon and Neo Japan Ladies Pro Wrestling co-promoted event, where the Neo Machineguns (Tanny Mouse and Yuki Miyazaki) defeated Aya Yuki and Ran Yu-Yu in the finals of a tournament to become the inaugural champions. Championship matches have a 20-minute time limit, and the title is vacated in the event of a time limit draw. Though primarily contested for by female wrestlers, seven male wrestlers; Masako Takanashi, Chounko/Choun Shiryu, Yuki Sato, Jun Kasai, Isami Kodaka, Gentaro and Makoto Oishi, have also held the title.

History 
Neo Machineguns (Tanny Mouse and Yuki Miyazaki) were the first champion in the title's history.  (Maki Narumiya and Risa Sera) holds the record for the longest reign at 356 days, as well as the most title defenses (9) in a single run along with Muscle Venus' (Hikaru Shida and Tsukasa Fujimoto) 3rd reign. Gentaro and Mai Ichii hold the record for the shortest reign, at two days. This is Ice Ribbon (Kurumi and Tsukushi) hold the record for most reigns as a team, with four. Tsukushi holds the record for most reigns individually, with nine.

Like most professional wrestling championships, the title is won as a result of a scripted match. There have been a total of 59 reigns shared among 46 different teams consisting of 56 distinctive wrestlers and 9 vacancies. Hamuko Hoshi and Makoto are the current champions in their second reign as a team.

Reigns

Combined reigns 

By team

By wrestler

See also 
 Goddess of Stardom Championship
 JWP Tag Team Championship
 Oz Academy Tag Team Championship
 Reina World Tag Team Championship
 Wave Tag Team Championship
Women's World Tag Team Championship

References

External links 
 Title history at IceRibbon.com
  International Ribbon Tag Team Championship

Ice Ribbon championships
Women's professional wrestling tag team championships